Daniel Gawthrop (born 1963 in Nanaimo, British Columbia) is a Canadian writer and editor. He is the author of five books, most recently The Trial of Pope Benedict and The Rice Queen Diaries. As a journalist he was the original publisher and editor of Xtra! West in Vancouver, and has also contributed to publications including the Vancouver Sun, The Economist, The Georgia Straight, Quill & Quire, Canadian Forum and The Tyee.  He now works as a communications representative for the Canadian Union of Public Employees.

Background
He was educated at the University of Victoria (BA 1987), the University of King's College (BJ 1988), and Royal Roads University (MA 2009).  During the 1990s, he worked as a journalist for various publications in British Columbia. In 1990, he was part of a gay writers group in the Vancouver area, which included Stan Persky, George Stanley and Scott Watson, that launched the literary magazine Sodomite Invasion Review. He was named as the first publisher and editor of Xtra! West in 1993.

During the 1994 NHL playoffs he attracted national attention when articles he had published in both Xtra! West and the Vancouver Sun, about the sex appeal of Vancouver Canucks hockey player Pavel Bure, drew commentary on Hockey Night in Canada from Don Cherry.

He is an active member of the Writers' Union of Canada.

Books
His first book, a biography of AIDS activist and educator Peter Jepson-Young titled Affirmation: The AIDS Odyssey of Dr. Peter (1994), examined its subject's life and contributions in the context of the conservative politics and mediascape of the times.

His second book, an examination of the New Democratic government of Mike Harcourt titled Highwire Act: Power, Pragmatism and the Harcourt Legacy, was published in 1996.

He followed up with Vanishing Halo: Saving the Boreal Forest in 1999, a book commissioned by the David Suzuki Foundation to raise awareness about the world's coniferous crown and the industrial practices that have threatened it.

After a few years in Thailand, where he worked as a sub-editor for the English language daily newspaper The Nation, he returned to Canada and in 2005 published The Rice Queen Diaries, a personal memoir that explores the political and cultural minefields of ethnicity and desire between white Western and Far East Asian men.

In 2013 he published The Trial of Pope Benedict: Joseph Ratzinger and the Vatican’s Assault on Reason, Compassion, and Human Dignity, a critical account of its subject's decades-long campaign to crush a liberal reform movement within the Roman Catholic Church after the Second Vatican Council.

Works
 Affirmation: The AIDS Odyssey of Dr. Peter (New Star Books, 1994) — 
 Highwire Act: Power, Pragmatism and the Harcourt Legacy (New Star Books, 1996) — 
 Vanishing Halo: Saving the Boreal Forest (Greystone Books/David Suzuki Foundation, 1999) — 
 The Rice Queen Diaries (2005, Arsenal Pulp Press) — 
 The Trial of Pope Benedict: Joseph Ratzinger and the Vatican’s Assault on Reason, Compassion, and Human Dignity (2013, Arsenal Pulp Press) —

References

External links

1963 births
Living people
20th-century Canadian non-fiction writers
Canadian newspaper reporters and correspondents
Canadian newspaper editors
Canadian male journalists
Canadian newspaper publishers (people)
Journalists from British Columbia
Canadian LGBT journalists
Canadian gay writers
People from Nanaimo
Writers from British Columbia
University of Victoria alumni
University of King's College alumni
21st-century Canadian journalists
21st-century Canadian LGBT people
21st-century Canadian non-fiction writers
20th-century Canadian male writers
21st-century Canadian male writers
Canadian male non-fiction writers